Dedicated is the third studio album by German DJ and producer ATB. It features 12 tracks including three top hits: "Let U Go", "Hold You" and "You're Not Alone". The album was released in 2002.

Track listing

Charts and certifications

Charts

Certifications

Personnel 

Bruce – artwork
Roberta Carter Harrison – vocals
Bill Platt – engineer
Marc Schilkowski – cover photo
Andre Tanneberger – arranger, producer, engineer
Todd Terry – producer, remixing

References

External links
 Dedicated on official ATB website

2002 albums
ATB albums